Stephen Whitmee High School is a senior high school in Morikao, Abaiang Island, Kiribati. It is affiliated with the Kiribati Uniting Church (formerly the Kiribati Protestant Church).

It opened in 1900. Circa 2012 the Japanese government funded the construction of a new 500 seat cafeteria because the former one was old and had asbestos problems. The Japanese government paid $97,087 U.S. dollars, about $94,583 Australian dollars.

See also
 Education in Kiribati

References

1900 establishments in the Gilbert and Ellice Islands
Christian schools in Kiribati
Educational institutions established in 1900
1900 in Christianity
High schools in Kiribati
Private schools in Oceania